The Green Papers is a website that follows the results of United States presidential elections. It was created by Richard Berg-Andersson and Tony Roza in 1999. It has become particularly known for covering the results of presidential primaries. It was one of the first websites to monitor election results. During the 2016 presidential election, many journalists began paying attention to the site's delegate counts, and Quoctrung Bui of The New York Times noted that the site "...does something very few media organizations are willing to do: accurately and independently tabulate delegates in real time."

References

External links

American political websites
Internet properties established in 1999
1999 establishments in the United States